Mosvatnet is a lake in the municipality of Stavanger in Rogaland county, Norway. The lake lies just west of the centre of the city of Stavanger in the Eiganes og Våland borough. At , it is the third largest lake in the city of Stavanger after Hålandsvatnet and Stora Stokkavatnet. The lake flows out through a small stream that runs through underground culverts to the Breiavatnet lake before emptying into the nearby Byfjorden.

Reservoir
Mosvatnet was Stavanger's main water source between 1863 and 1931. The Great Fire of Holmen in Stavanger in 1860 showed that the city had a weak water supply. In 1863, the city initiated the building of a new waterworks at Mosvatnet that both would give residents proper drinking water and better access to water for fire crews. A pump house was erected and water pipes were laid along the road Madlaveien (Rv 509). The water level of the pond was increased significantly, and several small islets and rocks disappeared. The city took over several properties along the lake to prevent contamination of drinking water source and it made the surrounding areas into parkland. After a short time it was realized that Mosvatnet did not have enough capacity to supply the growing city with drinking water in the long term.  In 1903, the city of Stavanger bought water rights for the Stora Stokkavatnet lake and in 1930 that lake became the city's new water reservoir.

See also
List of lakes in Norway

References

Stavanger
Lakes of Rogaland